Standard Manufacturing is an American firearms manufacturer based in New Britain, Connecticut. The company is best known for the design and manufacture of the DP-12, a 12-gauge double-barreled pump shotgun.

History
Standard manufacturing was founded in 2011 as the firearms design and manufacturing subsidiary of the Connecticut Shotgun Manufacturing Company, a manufacturer, repairer, and distributor of shotguns and related products.

Products
Product names in italics are no longer listed on the company's website.

Pistols
 1911 – a version of the M1911 pistol
 S333 Thunderstruck – a .22 WMR double-barreled personal defense revolver firing two rounds per trigger pull
 S333 Volleyfire – a .25 ACP pepperbox-style pocket pistol firing two rounds per trigger pull; first presented at SHOT Show 2017, it was later developed into the Thunderstruck
 Single Action Revolver – a version of the Colt Single Action Army
Switch-Gun™: a self-defense .22 Magnum revolver that can fold its grip.

Long guns
 DP-12 – a 12-gauge double-barreled pump shotgun
 SKO – a 12-gauge shotgun variant of the AR-15
 STD-15 – a variant of the AR-15 available in multiple models and calibers
 G4S – a semi-automatic .22 caliber version of the Thompson submachine gun
 SP-12- an ambidextrous pump-action 12-gauge shotgun

References

External links
 Standard Manufacturing official page
 Connecticut Shotguns official page

2011 establishments in Connecticut
Companies based in Hartford County, Connecticut
Manufacturing companies based in Connecticut
Firearm manufacturers of the United States